Quinton Flynn is an American voice actor and comedian, who has provided the English voices of video game characters such as Raiden in the Metal Gear series, Marcus Damon in Digimon Data Squad, Lea and Axel in the Kingdom Hearts series.

Early life
Quinton Flynn was born in Cleveland, Ohio. He is a graduate of the Bowling Green State University and Kent State University.

Career
Flynn began his career in 1992, his first acting credit was the character Jonathan Willis Internal Monologe in the television film Jonathan: The Boy Nobody Wanted. He also worked in sketch comedy, such as portraying Paul McCartney on Jimmy Kimmel Live!. He reprised the role again in the comedy film, My Dinner with Jimi.

As a voice actor, he has provided many character voices in animated films, television shows, anime and video games. He is a frequently recurring actor in the Crash Bandicoot video game series. He later became the voice of Silver the Hedgehog in the Sonic the Hedgehog series starting in 2010, he continued to voice the character for seven more years until 2017 when he was replaced by Bryce Papenbrook.

Flynn also provided the voice of Reno in Final Fantasy VII and its sequels and prequels, and Henry in No More Heroes. He is also best known for providing the voices of Raiden in the Metal Gear Solid video game series and Lea and Axel in the Kingdom Hearts series. He played the role of Kael'thas Sunstrider in Warcraft III and World of Warcraft; his lines in the latter were replaced in 2021.

In television, he voiced Timon in Disney's Timon & Pumbaa, replacing Nathan Lane after he voiced the character for 10 episodes. Flynn also provided the voice of Mickey Mouse in the Mickey Mouse Works episode "Minnie Takes Care of Pluto".

Additionally, he voiced many other characters in All Grown Up!, The Angry Beavers, As Told by Ginger, Avatar: The Last Airbender, The Avengers: Earth's Mightiest Heroes, Cow and Chicken, Dave the Barbarian, Fantastic Four, Freakazoid!, Generator Rex, The Grim Adventures of Billy and Mandy, Johnny Bravo, Mad, My Life as a Teenage Robot, The Real Adventures of Jonny Quest, Robot Chicken, Samurai Jack, Scooby-Doo! Mystery Incorporated, Spider-Man: The Animated Series, Stuart Little and Teen Titans.

In anime, he voiced Iruka Umino in Naruto, Naruto: Shippuden and The Last: Naruto the Movie. He also voiced characters such as Shingo Shoji for the Tokyopop dub of the Initial D series, Marcus Damon in  Digimon Data Squad, Reno in Final Fantasy VII Advent Children, Raiden in the English dub of Metal Gear Solid 2: Bande Dessinee, Carl and McCoy in Blood+, Kon in Bleach series and Dr. Riddles in Zatch Bell.

Filmography

Animation

 All Grown Up! – Kid #3, Funny Hair Man (Ep. 9)
 Animaniacs – Joey, and Ross
 The Angry Beavers – Rusty, Singer
 As Told by Ginger – George Magrority
 Avatar: The Last Airbender – Tycho (Ep. 35)
 The Avengers: Earth's Mightiest Heroes – Malekith the Accursed
 Cow and Chicken – Beaver #1, Man
 Dave the Barbarian – King, Cute Backstreet Minstrel
 Fantastic Four – Human Torch/Johnny Storm (season 2)
 Freakazoid! – Elliot (Ep. "Nerdator")
 Generator Rex – Beau (Ep. "Rock My World"; uncredited)
 The Grim Adventures of Billy and Mandy – Harvey, Bailiff, Dr. Gaylord
 Johnny Bravo – Boy #1
 Mad – Jack Harper, Captain Thomas Gregson, MADitorial Announcer (Ep. "POblivion/Umbrellamentary")
 Mickey Mouse Works – Mickey Mouse
 My Life as a Teenage Robot – Sheldon Lee, Don Prima, additional voices
 The Real Adventures of Jonny Quest – Ben, Jonny Quest (season 2), Policeman
 Robot Chicken – Elmer Fudd, Swiper the Fox, additional voices
 Samurai Jack – Monk A
 Scooby-Doo! Mystery Incorporated – Additional voices (2 episodes)
 Seal Team - Shark
 Spider-Man: The Animated Series – Human Torch/Johnny Storm
 Stuart Little – Snowbell (13 episodes, replacing Nathan Lane)
 Teen Titans – Lightning
 Timon & Pumbaa – Timon (24 episodes)
 Totally Spies – Rick
 Xyber 9: New Dawn – Mick

Anime

 Initial D series – Shingo Shoji (Tokyopop dub)
 Digimon Data Squad – Marcus Damon
 Final Fantasy VII Advent Children – Reno
 Metal Gear Solid 2: Bande Dessinee – Raiden (English voice)
 Naruto – Iruka Umino
 Naruto: Shippuden – Iruka Umino
 Blood+ – Carl, McCoy
 Bleach – Kon
 The Last: Naruto the Movie – Iruka Umino, Messenger
 Zatch Bell – Dr. Riddles

Film

 Bilal: A New Breed of Hero – Additional voices
 Globehunters: An Around The World in Eighty Days Adventure – Dr. Wilkins, Spume
 Immigrants – Hermaphrodite, Businessman
 The Jungle Book: Mowgli's Story – Bad Baboon, Wolf #3
 Ultimate Avengers – Additional voices

Video games

 Arc the Lad: Twilight of the Spirits – Kharg (English version)
 Armored Core 4 – Sir Maurescu, Base Defense Force (English version)
 Call of Duty: United Offensive – Private Ender
 Cartoon Network: Punch Time Explosion – Billy (3DS version only), Toiletnator (XL version only)
 Crash Bandicoot series
 Nitro Kart – Doctor N. Gin, Nitros Oxide
 Tag Team Racing – Chick Gizzard Lips
 Twinsanity – The Evil Twins (Victor and Moritz), Doctor N. Gin, Penguin, Skunk
 Crisis Core: Final Fantasy VII – Reno (English version)
 Curse of Monkey Island – Mr. Fossey
 Digimon World Data Squad – Marcus Damon (English version)
 Final Fantasy X – Isaaru
 Final Fantasy X-2 – Isaaru
 Gurumin: A Monstrous Adventure – Roger, Poco (English version)
 Hearthstone – Kael'thas Sunstrider (Lines replaced)
 Heroes of the Storm – Kael'thas Sunstrider
 Kingdom Hearts series – Axel (English voice)
 II
 Kingdom Hearts Re:Chain of Memories
 358/2 Days
 Birth by Sleep – Lea
 Dream Drop Distance – Lea (English voice)
 1.5 Remix (archived and new footage)
 2.5 Remix – Axel/Lea (English voice) (archived and new footage)
 2.8 Final Chapter Prologue – Axel/Lea (English voice) (archived footage)
 III – Axel/Lea (English voice)
 La Pucelle: Tactics – Croix (English version)
 League of Legends - Jhin
 The Lord of the Rings: The Fellowship of the Ring: The Video Game – Merry, Gollum
 Madagascar: The Video Game – Big Mouth Parrot, Delivery Truck Driver, Sailor #1, Lemur #2
 Marvel: Ultimate Alliance – Spider-Man/Peter Parker
 Metal Gear Solid series – Raiden (English version)
 Sons of Liberty
 Portable Ops – Fox Soldier B
 Guns of the Patriots
 Revengeance
 Minority Report: Everybody Runs – Danny Witwer, Rufus T. Riley, additional voices
 Naruto Shippuden: Ultimate Ninja Impact – Iruka Umino (English version)
 Naruto Shippuden: Ultimate Ninja Storm 3 – Iruka Umino (English version)
 Naruto Shippuden: Ultimate Ninja Storm Generations – Iruka Umino (English version)
 No More Heroes – Henry Cooldown (English version)
 No More Heroes 2: Desperate Struggle – Henry Cooldown (English version)
 Onimusha: Blade Warriors – Kotaro Fuma (English version)
 Orphen: Scion of Sorcery – Orphen (English version)
 Pirates of the Caribbean: The Legend of Jack Sparrow – Lucky, Ice Viking King, Magistrate of Nassau, Port Royal Civilian
 PlayStation All-Stars Battle Royale – Raiden
 Rogue Galaxy – Monsha, Toady, Ugozl lo Burkaqua (English version)
 Shark Tale – Middle-age Man Fish, News-truck Fish
 Shadow of Rome – Askari, additional voices (English version)
 Sonic the Hedgehog series – Silver the Hedgehog (2010-2019, replaces Pete Capella) (English version)
 Colors (DS version only; credited as Derek Allen)
 Forces - Eagle Squad Soldier
 Free Riders
 Generations
 Mario & Sonic series:
 London 2012 Olympic Games
 Sochi 2014 Winter Olympic Games
 Rio 2016 Olympic Games
 Spider-Man: Friend or Foe – Venom
 The Bard's Tale – Additional voices
 The Saboteur – Additional voices
 True Crime: New York City – Additional voices
 Warcraft 3: The Frozen Throne – Kael'thas Sunstrider (Lines replaced)
 Warcraft 3: Reforged – Kael'thas Sunstrider (Lines replaced)
 World of Warcraft: The Burning Crusade – Kael'thas Sunstrider, High Botanist Freywinn (Line replaced)
 World of Warcraft: Shadowlands – Kael'thas Sunstrider (Lines replaced)
 The Wonderful 101 – Prince Vorkken (English voice)
 X-Men Legends II: Rise of Apocalypse – Banshee, Abyss

Live-action

 Against the Sun – Newsreel Narrator
 A Hard Day's Day – Paul McCartney
 Eyewitness – Joe
 I'd Kill for You – Narrator (voice)
 Jimmy Kimmel Live! – Paul McCartney
 Jonathan: The Boy Nobody Wanted – Jonathan Willis
 Leap of Faith – Man from Bar
 Men Behaving Badly – Bill Clinton
 My Dinner With Jimi – Paul McCartney
 The Christopher Walken Ecstatic Dance Academy – Christopher Walken
 The Mystery of Natalie Wood – James Dean V.O. (voice)
 WTF: World Thumbwrestling Federation – Nilsson Ovërgartten

Discography 
Puzzled Yesterdays EP - 2011:

• 1: Miss Right (2:43)

• 2: Puzzled Yesterdays (2:59)

• 3: Billy (4:08)

References

External links
 
 
 

Living people
American male video game actors
American male voice actors
Bowling Green State University alumni
Kent State University alumni
Male actors from Cleveland
Male actors from Los Angeles
People from Los Angeles
American male comedians
20th-century American comedians
21st-century American comedians
Blizzard Entertainment people
Sony Interactive Entertainment people
21st-century American male actors
20th-century American male actors
Year of birth missing (living people)